Wagenberg is a village in the Dutch province of North Brabant. It is located in the municipality of Drimmelen.

History 
The village was first mentioned in 1331 as Wagenberghe, and means "hill of Wago (person)." Wagenberg developed to the north of Terheijden in the Middle Ages.

The Catholic St Gummarus Church is a three aisled basilica-like church in Gothic Revival style. It was built between 1903 and 1904 as a replacement of the 1796 church. In 1944, a bomb fell through the roof, but did not explode, and the damage could be repaired.

Wagenberg was home to 1,195 people in 1840. The village was damaged by war in October and November 1944 resulting in 21 deaths among the population. The village used to be part of the municipality of Terheijden. In 1997, it became part of the Drimmelen.

Notable people 
 Michel van de Korput (born 1956), former footballer

Gallery

References 

Populated places in North Brabant
Drimmelen